William Meyers (23 July 1943 in Johannesburg – 7 May 2014) was a South African boxer who won a bronze medal at the 1960 Summer Olympics in Rome fighting as a featherweight.

Meyers, who was only 17 during the Rome Olympics, was the youngest South African boxer ever to win an Olympic medal.  He never turned professional.

1960 Olympic results
Below is the record of William Meyers, a South African featherweight boxer who competed at the 1960 Rome Olympics:

 Round of 32: defeated Than Tun (Burma) by decision, 5-0
 Round of 16: defeated Hsu Teng-yun (Chinese Taipei) by a third-round knockout
 Quarterfinal: defeated Constantin Gheorghiu (Romania) by decision, 5-0
 Semifinal: lost to Jerzy Adamski (Poland) by decision, 1-4 (was awarded bronze medal)

References

1943 births
2014 deaths
Boxers from Johannesburg
Featherweight boxers
Olympic boxers of South Africa
Olympic bronze medalists for South Africa
Boxers at the 1960 Summer Olympics
Olympic medalists in boxing
Medalists at the 1960 Summer Olympics
South African male boxers